The 2017–18 Incarnate Word Cardinals men's basketball team represented the University of the Incarnate Word during the 2017–18 NCAA Division I men's basketball season. The Cardinals were led by 12th-year head coach Ken Burmeister and played their home games at McDermott Convocation Center in San Antonio, Texas as members of the Southland Conference. The Cardinals finished the season 7–21, 2–16 in Southland play to finish in a tie for 11th place. They failed to qualify for the Southland tournament.

The season marked the Cardinals' first full season as a Division I school after a four-year transition period from Division II to Division I and were thus eligible for postseason play.

On March 6, 2018, the school announced that head coach Ken Burmeister would not return as head coach. The Cardinals hired Carson Cunningham from Carroll College of the NAIA as the new head coach on March 22, 2018.

Previous season
The Cardinals finished the 2016–17 season 12–17, 7–11 in Southland play to finish in a five-way tie for eighth place.

The season was the final year of a four-year transitional period for Incarnate Word from Division II to Division I. During year four, the Cardinals played a normal conference schedule. They were Division I for scheduling purposes and were also considered as a Division I RPI member, but were not eligible for postseason play.

Roster

Schedule and results

|-
!colspan=9 style=| Non-conference regular season

|-
!colspan=9 style=| Southland regular season

See also
 2017–18 Incarnate Word Cardinals women's basketball team

References

Incarnate Word Cardinals men's basketball seasons
Incarnate Word
Incarnate Word Cardinals men's basketball
Incarnate Word Cardinals men's basketball